The 1997 Latvian Individual Speedway Championship was the 23rd Latvian Individual Speedway Championship season. The final took place on 7 August 1997 in Daugavpils, Latvia.

Results
 August 7, 1997
  Daugavpils

Speedway in Latvia
1997 in Latvian sport
1997 in speedway